Louisiana's 5th congressional district is a congressional district in the U.S. state of Louisiana. The 5th district encompasses rural northeastern Louisiana and much of central Louisiana, as well as the northern part of Louisiana's Florida parishes in southeastern Louisiana, taking in Monroe, Alexandria, Opelousas, Amite and Bogalusa.

The district is currently represented by Republican Julia Letlow, who was elected in a 2021 special election to replace her husband, representative-elect Luke, who died of COVID-19 days before he was set to be sworn in.

Previous election cycles

2014 election
In 2014, Ralph Abraham defeated Monroe Mayor Jamie Mayo for the 113th United States Congress, replacing McAllister, who was defeated in the Louisiana primary. On February 26, 2020, Abraham announced he would not be seeking re-election for a fourth term, honoring his pledge to only serve three terms in Congress.

2013 special election
"On November 16, 2013, Republican newcomer Vance McAllister, a businessman from Swartz, Louisiana, handily defeated fellow Republican State Senator Neil Riser of Columbia in Caldwell Parish to claim the seat in a special election. McAllister beat Riser, 54,449 (59.7) to 36,837 (40.3 percent).

Analysts considered McAllister's victory as a rejection of Jindal's efforts to have the seat vacated and to replace Alexander with his hand-picked candidate in a low-turnout special election. The runoff turnout was less than 19%, three percent less than in the primary.

Recent presidential elections

List of members representing the district

Recent election results

2002

2004

NOTE: Rodney Alexander switched from the Democratic to the Republican Party.

2006

2008

2010

2012

2013 (special)

2014

2016

2018

2020

2021 (special)

2022

Historical district boundaries

See also

 Louisiana's congressional districts
 List of United States congressional districts

References

 
 
 Congressional Biographical Directory of the United States 1774–present

05